Randolph Mainwaring (26 July 1839 – 27 December 1902) was an English cricketer. He played in four first-class matches in New Zealand for Canterbury from 1866 to 1871.

See also
 List of Canterbury representative cricketers

References

External links
 

1839 births
1902 deaths
English cricketers
Canterbury cricketers
Sportspeople from Newcastle-under-Lyme